Marc Thiercelin, known as "Captain Marck", is a French professional yachtsman, born on October 29, 1960 in Saâcy-sur-Marne (Seine-et-Marne). He totals five solo rounds of the world together with 22 transatlantic races, seven editions of the Solitaire du Figaro (two stage wins) and five Tour de France sailing. He completed four complete tours of Antarctica and four solo Cape Horns for a total of 700,000 km covered on all the world's oceans.

Race result highlights

 2nd 1996–1997 Vendée Globe
2nd 1998–1999 Around Alone Race
 4th 2000–2001 Vendée Globe
 DNF 2004–2005 Vendée Globe
 DNF 2008–2009 Vendée Globe

References

External links 
 Official Website

1960 births
Living people
IMOCA 60 class sailors
French male sailors (sport)
Vendée Globe finishers
1996 Vendee Globe sailors
2000 Vendee Globe sailors
2004 Vendee Globe sailors
2008 Vendee Globe sailors
French Vendee Globe sailors
Single-handed circumnavigating sailors